Rho GTPase-activating protein 9 is an enzyme that in humans is encoded by the ARHGAP9 gene.

Function 

This gene encodes a member of the Rho-GAP family of GTPase activating proteins. The protein has substantial GAP activity towards several Rho-family GTPases in vitro, converting them to an inactive GDP-bound state. It is implicated in regulating adhesion of hematopoietic cells to the extracellular matrix. Multiple transcript variants encoding different isoforms have been found for this gene.

References

External links

Further reading